The George Polk Awards in Journalism are a series of American journalism awards presented annually by Long Island University in New York.

Awards

References

American journalism awards
Awards established in 1949
George Polk
 
George Polk